Susana Fraile Celaya (born 4 July 1978) is a Spanish team handball player who played for CBF Elda and on the Spanish national team. She was born in Zumarraga. She competed at the 2004 Summer Olympics in Athens, where the Spanish team reached the quarter finals, and placed sixth in the tournament.

References

1978 births
Living people
Sportspeople from Gipuzkoa
Spanish female handball players
Olympic handball players of Spain
Handball players at the 2004 Summer Olympics
People from Goierri
Handball players from the Basque Country (autonomous community)